Centers for Faith and Opportunity Initiatives are bodies within U.S. federal government agencies giving religious groups more voice in government programs. The executive order on the "Establishment of a White House Faith and Opportunity Initiative" issued in May 2018 during the presidency of Donald Trump requires all executive departments to designate a Liaison for Faith and Opportunity Initiatives to coordinate with a new Advisor to the White House.

In November 2018, Scott Lloyd was appointed to the Center for Faith and Opportunity Initiatives of the United States Department of Health and Human Services (HHS). Lloyd, who had previously headed the Office of Refugee Resettlement at the HHS, is a noted opponent of abortion.

On October 31, 2019, the White House confirmed that Paula White, a televangelist, pastor, and author, would join the White House Office to advise Trump's Faith and Opportunity Initiative. She supported Trump during his 2016 campaign.

References 

Agencies of the United States government